Small Steps: The Year I Got Polio is a memoir of author Peg Kehret's childhood experience of polio. The book won the Golden Kite Award in 1997.

Characters
Peg: Main character and narrator of the story, diagnosed with polio.
Karen: Peg's best friend at school
Tommy: Peg's hospital roommate at University Hospital, in an iron lung.
Renee: Sheltering Arms roommate, who goes home for Christmas.
Shirley: Sheltering Arms roommate, who has the worst polio and likes marshmallows.
Alice: Sheltering Arms roommate, who has been there for ten years. Her parents didn't want to take care of her because she was so badly crippled, and she became a ward of the state. Later she dies from Polio.
Dorothy: Sheltering Arms roommate, who longs to be in leg braces to go home. She is able to return home because her family builds her a ramp.
Mrs. Crab: Peg's physical therapist at University Hospital, whom Peg doesn't like. She gives her Torture Time: hot packs and stretching. Peg highly disliked her.
Art: Peg's older brother whom Dorothy adores. Art is a college student.
Dr. Bevis: Peg's doctor at University Hospital. Peg promises to walk for him one day.
Miss. Ballard: Peg's physical therapist at Sheltering Arms that Peg is very fond of and she is also very good friends with Peg's parents.
Kenny: A boy who plays in the Christmas pageant who helped Peg. He was going to be discharged the day after that.
Mom: Peg's supportive mother
Dad: Peg's supportive father
B.J.: Peg's dog who almost got locked in the basement when she returned home for Christmas.

Settings
The story takes place in Peg's school, Peg's house, at the Sheltering Arms, and at the University Hospital beginning in 1949.

Reception
Small Steps won the Dorothy Canfield Fisher Children's Book Award, the Golden Kite Award in 1997 and the Mark Twain Readers Award in 1997.

References

1996 children's books
Children's non-fiction books
American children's books
American memoirs
Golden Kite Award-winning works
Works about polio
Books about diseases
Books about writers
Mark Twain Awards
Polio